Ylikersantti ( in Swedish) is a Finnish military rank above  and below . The rank was introduced in the Swedish Armed Forces in 2019. It is above  and below .

Finland
Formerly the rank was mainly used by junior officers-in-reserve (with a reserve rank of at least vänrikki) working as temporary contractual personnel. This gave them seniority over conscript sergeants or officer cadets, but subordinated them to commissioned officers (with an active service rank of vänrikki or higher). However, currently it is either a reserve rank, or a rank available to professional NCOs.

Sweden
Promotion
Duties
 are Specialist Officers at Skill Levels B (Intermediate) and C (Advanced). The  typically serves as a squad leader or platoon sergeant.

See also 
 Finnish military ranks

References

Military ranks of Finland
Military ranks of the Swedish Army
Military insignia

fi:Sotilasarvot Suomen puolustusvoimissa
sv:Lista över finländska militära grader